Joseph Anton Koch (27 July 1768 – 12 January 1839) was an Austrian painter of Neoclassicism and later the German Romantic movement; he is perhaps the most significant neoclassical landscape painter.

Biography

The Tyrolese painter was born in Elbigenalp. Early in his life he was tending cattle. Through the recommendation of Bishop Umgelder (1785), he received academic training in the Karlsschule Stuttgart, a strict military academy. In 1791, he ran away, and traveled through France and Switzerland. He arrived in Rome in 1795. Koch was close to the painter Asmus Jacob Carstens and carried on Carstens' "heroic" art, at first in a literal manner. He etched the pages of Carstens' Les Argonautes, selon Pindar, Orphée et Apollonius de Rhode (Rome, 1799).

After 1800, Koch developed as a landscape painter. In Rome, he espoused a new type of "heroic" landscape, revising the classical compositions of Poussin and Lorrain with a more rugged, mountainous scenery. In 1812, forced through inadequate income from his work, or in protest of the French invasion, he went to Vienna, where he worked prolifically. He stayed in Vienna until 1815. During this period, he incorporated more non-classical themes in his work. In Vienna, he was influenced by Friedrich Schlegel and enthusiasts of old German art. In response, his style became harsher.

Koch returned to Rome, and became a conspicuous figure in the German artists' colony there. He painted, among other works, the four frescoes in the Dante Room of the Villa Massimi (1824–1829). His presence and personality had considerable influence among the younger generation in the art life of Rome, and his new approach had a wide influence on German landscape painters who visited Rome.

He wrote Moderne Kunstchronik oder die rumfordische Suppe gekocht und geschrieben von J. A. Koch (Stuttgart, 1834) which was directed humorously against unjustifiable criticism and false connoisseurship.

Koch's last years were spent in great poverty. He died in Rome, where he was buried in the Teutonic Cemetery, located next to St. Peter's Basilica within Vatican City.

Works
 Landscape with Noah, ca. 1803 – oil on canvas [86 × 116 cm] (Städel Museum, Frankfurt)
 Schmadribach Falls in the Lauterbach Valley, 1811
 Noah's Sacrifice, 1813
 Grimsel Pass, 1813
 View in the Sabine Mountains, 1813
 Monastery of San Francesco di Civitella, 1814
Landscape with Ruth and Boaz, ca. 1823/25 – oil on canvas
Grindelwald Glacier in the Alps, 1823, National Museum in Wrocław
 View of Nauplia, 1830
 View Near Subiaco
 Macbeth and the Witches
He etched 20 Italian landscapes and a large sheet representing The Oath of the French at Millesimo; 14 pages after Dante, adding later another 30 pages (published Vicenza, 1904), and 36 pages after Ossian. He contributed American landscape scenes to the works of Alexander von Humboldt (1805).

References 

Vaughan, William (1980). German Romantic Painting. New Haven and London: Yale University Press; pp. 37–38. 

Attribution

Further reading 
 Strauss, Kleine Schriften (Bonn, 1877)
 Frimmel, in Dohme, Kunst und Künstler des neunzehnten Jahrhunderts (Leipzig, 1884)

External links 

 Works by Joseph Koch at the Museum of New Zealand Te Papa Tongarewa
German masters of the nineteenth century: paintings and drawings from the Federal Republic of Germany, a full text exhibition catalog from The Metropolitan Museum of Art, which contains material on Joseph Anton Koch (no. 38–40)

1768 births
1839 deaths
18th-century Austrian people
19th-century Austrian people
18th-century Austrian painters
18th-century Austrian male artists
Austrian male painters
19th-century Austrian painters
19th-century Austrian male artists
Austrian landscape painters
People from Reutte District
Burials at the Teutonic Cemetery
People educated at the Karlsschule Stuttgart
Nazarene painters